Karazirikovo (Qarayerek) is a rural locality (a selo) in Chekmagushevsky District, Bashkortostan, Russia. The population was 405 as of 2010. There are 6 streets.

Geography 
Karazirikovo is located 23 km northeast of Chekmagush (the district's administrative centre) by road. Kargaly is the nearest rural locality.

References 

Rural localities in Chekmagushevsky District